The  took place in Imperial Japan during World War II. Between 1943 and 1945, the Yokohama Special Higher Police arrested nearly three-dozen intellectuals for charges of attempting to revive the Communist Party. Suspects included editors of the Chuo Koron, Kaizo, and Nippon Hyoron magazines. Suspects were subjected to physical violence, and three died as a result of mistreatment.

In 2010, the Yokohama District Court ordered the government to pay compensation to the relatives of five deceased men for falsely imprisoning them.

See also
Popular Front Incident
Red Scare in Japan
Political repression in Imperial Japan
Peace Preservation Law

References

Further reading
Janice Matsumura Symposium: More Than a Momentary Nightmare: The Yokohama Incident and Wartime Japan, Cornell Univ East Asia Program, 1998

External links
 The Yokohama Case 2010/02/04 Court ruling gives de facto acquittal to 5 in wartime free speech (Mainichi Japan) February 4, 2010 at Japan Innocence & Death Penalty Information Center.

Political repression in Japan
Politics of the Empire of Japan
Shōwa period
Yokohama